Kenneth Sidney "Kenny" Drew (August 28, 1928 – August 4, 1993) was an American-Danish jazz pianist.

Biography
Drew was born in New York City, United States, and received piano lessons from the age of five. He attended the High School of Music & Art in Manhattan. Drew's first recording, in 1950, was with Howard McGhee, and over the next two years he worked in bands led by Buddy DeFranco, Coleman Hawkins, Lester Young, and Charlie Parker, among others. After a brief period with his own trio in California, Drew returned to New York, playing with Dinah Washington, Johnny Griffin, Buddy Rich, and several others over the following few years. He led many recording sessions throughout the 1950s, and in 1957 appeared on John Coltrane's album, Blue Train.

Drew was one of the American jazz musicians who settled in Europe around this period: he moved to Paris in 1961 and to Copenhagen three years later. While he sacrificed much of the interest of the American jazz audience, he gained a wide following across Europe. Kenny Drew was a well-known figure on the Copenhagen jazz scene, recording many sessions with the Danish bassist Niels-Henning Ørsted Pedersen. "Living in Copenhagen, and travelling out from there," Drew remarked, "I have probably worked in more different contexts than if I had stayed in New York where I might have got musically locked in with a set-group of musicians. This way, I have been able to keep my musical antennas in shape, while at the same time I have had more time to study and also get deeper into my own endeavors."

Drew and Dexter Gordon appeared on screen in Ole Ege's theatrically released hardcore pornographic film, Pornografi – en musical (1971), for which they composed and performed the score.

Drew died in August 1993 in Copenhagen, Denmark (he had stomach cancer, but it was unclear if this was the cause of death) and was interred in the Assistens Cemetery in Nørrebro, Copenhagen. He has a street named after him in southern Copenhagen, "Kenny Drews Vej" (Eng., Kenny Drew Street).

His son, Kenny Drew Jr., was also a jazz pianist.

Playing style
His touch was described in The Biographical Encyclopedia of Jazz as "precise", and his playing as being a combination of bebop-influenced melodic improvisation and block chords, including "refreshingly subtle harmonizations".

Discography

As leader 
{| class="wikitable sortable"
!Year recorded
!Title
!Label
!Year released
!Notes
|-
|1953
|New Faces, New Sounds
|Blue Note
| 1953
|Trio, with Curly Russell (bass), Art Blakey (drums)
|-
|1953–54
|Kenny Drew and His Progressive Piano
|Norgran
| 1954
|One track solo piano; some tracks trio with Gene Wright (bass), Lawrence Marable (drums); some tracks trio with Wright (bass), Charles "Specs" Wright (drums); also released as The Modernity of Kenny Drew; contains tracks originally released on The Ideation of Kenny Drew
|-
|1955
|Talkin' & Walkin'
|Jazz: West
| 1956
|Quartet, with Joe Maini (alto sax, tenor sax), Leroy Vinnegar (bass), Lawrence Marable (drums)
|-
|1956
|Embers Glow
|Jazz: West
| 1956
|Sextet; some tracks with Joe Maini (alto sax), Ted Efantis (tenor sax), Leroy Vinnegar (bass), Lawrence Marable (drums), Jane Fielding (vocals); some tracks with Paul Chambers (bass) replacing Vinnegar
|-
|1956
|Kenny Drew Trio
|Riverside 
|1956
|Trio, with Paul Chambers (bass), Philly Joe Jones (drums)
|-
|1957
|A Harry Warren Showcase
|Judson
| 1957
|Duo, with Wilbur Ware (bass)
|-
|1957
|A Harold Arlen Showcase
|Judson
| 1957
|Duo, with Wilbur Ware (bass)
|-
|1957
|I Love Jerome Kern
|Riverside
| 1957
|Duo, with Wilbur Ware (bass)
|-
|1957
|This Is New
|Riverside
| 1957
|Some tracks quartet, with Donald Byrd (trumpet), Wilbur Ware (bass), G.T. Hogan (drums); most tracks quintet, with Hank Mobley (tenor sax) added
|-
|1957
|Pal Joey
|Riverside
| 1958
|Trio, with Wilbur Ware (bass), Philly Joe Jones (drums)
|-
|1960
|Undercurrent
|Blue Note
| 1961
|Quintet, with Freddie Hubbard (trumpet), Hank Mobley (tenor sax), Sam Jones (bass), Louis Hayes (drums)
|-
|1973
|Duo
|SteepleChase
| 1973
|Duo, with Niels-Henning Ørsted Pedersen (bass)
|-
|1973
|Everything I Love
|SteepleChase
| 1974
|Solo piano
|-
|1974
|Duo 2
|SteepleChase 
|1974
|Duo, with Niels-Henning Ørsted Pedersen (bass)
|-
|1974
|Dark Beauty
|SteepleChase
| 1974
|Trio, with Niels-Henning Ørsted Pedersen (bass), Albert Heath (drums)
|-
|1974
|If You Could See Me Now
|SteepleChase
| 1975
|Trio, with Niels-Henning Ørsted Pedersen (bass), Albert Heath (drums)
|-
|1974
|Duo Live in Concert
|SteepleChase
| 1975
|Duo, with Niels-Henning Ørsted Pedersen (bass); in concert
|-
|1975
|Morning
|SteepleChase
| 1976
|Trio, with Niels-Henning Ørsted Pedersen (bass), Philip Catherine (guitar)
|-
|1977
|In Concert
|SteepleChase
| 1979
|Trio, with Niels-Henning Ørsted Pedersen (bass), Philip Catherine (guitar); in concert
|-
|1977
|Lite Flite
|SteepleChase
| 1977
|Quintet, with Thad Jones (flugelhorn, cornet), Bob Berg (tenor sax), George Mraz (bass), Jimmy Cobb (drums)
|-
|1977
|Ruby, My Dear
|SteepleChase
| 1980
|Trio, with David Friesen (bass), Clifford Jarvis (drums)
|-
|1978
|Home Is Where the Soul Is
|Xanadu
| 1978
|Trio, with Leroy Vinnegar (bass guitar), Frank Butler (drums)
|-
|1978
|For Sure!
|Xanadu
| 1978
|Quintet, with Charles McPherson (alto sax), Sam Noto (trumpet), Leroy Vinnegar (bass), Frank Butler (drums)
|-
|1980
|Afternoon In Europe
|Baystate
| 1983
|Trio, with Niels-Henning Ørsted Pedersen (bass), Ed Thigpen (drums)
|-
|1981
|All The Things You Are
|?
| 1981
|Quartet, with Junior Cook(tenor sax), Sam Jones (bass), Jimmy Cobb (drums)
|-
|1981
|It Might as Well Be Spring
|Soul Note
| 1982
|Solo piano
|-
|1981
|Your Soft Eyes
|Soul Note
| 1982
|Trio, with Mads Vinding (bass), Ed Thigpen (drums)
|-
|1982
|Playtime: Children's Songs by Kenny Drew and Mads Vinding
|Metronome
| 1982
|Duo, with Mads Vinding (bass)
|-
|1982
|The Lullaby
|Baystate
| 1982
|Trio, with Niels-Henning Ørsted Pedersen (bass), Ed Thigpen (drums)
|-
|1982?
|Moonlit Desert
|Baystate
| 1982
|With Niels-Henning Ørsted Pedersen (bass), Ed Thigpen (drums), The Almost Big Band
|-
|1966–83
|Solo-Duo
|Storyville
| 1996
|Some tracks solo; some tracks duo, with Niels-Henning Ørsted Pedersen and Bo Stief (bass; separately)
|-
|1983
|Swingin' Love
|Baystate
| 1983
|Trio, with Niels-Henning Ørsted Pedersen (bass), Ed Thigpen (drums)
|-
|1983
|And Far Away
|Soul Note
| 1983
|Quartet, with Philip Catherine (guitar), Niels-Henning Ørsted Pedersen (bass), Barry Altschul (drums)
|-
|1983
|Fantasia
|Baystate
| 1987
|Trio, with Niels-Henning Ørsted Pedersen (bass), Ed Thigpen (drums)
|-
|1984
|Trippin|Baystate
| 1984
|Trio, with Niels-Henning Ørsted Pedersen (bass), Ed Thigpen (drums)
|-
|1985
|By Request
|Baystate
| 1985
|Trio, with Niels-Henning Ørsted Pedersen (bass), Ed Thigpen (drums)
|-
|1985
|By Request II
|Baystate
| 1986
|Trio, with Niels-Henning Ørsted Pedersen (bass), Ed Thigpen (drums)
|-
|1986
|Elegy
|Baystate
| 1987
|Trio, with Niels-Henning Ørsted Pedersen (bass), Ed Thigpen (drums)
|-
|1987
|Dream
|Baystate
| 1987
|Trio, with Niels-Henning Ørsted Pedersen (bass), Ed Thigpen (drums)
|-
|1988
|Impressions
|Timeless
| 1988
|Trio, with Niels-Henning Ørsted Pedersen (bass), Alvin Queen (drums)
|-
|1989
|Recollections
|Timeless
| 1989
|Trio, with Niels-Henning Ørsted Pedersen (bass), Alvin Queen (drums)
|-
|1990
|Expressions
|Timeless
| 1990
|Trio, with Niels-Henning Ørsted Pedersen (bass), Alvin Queen (drums)
|-
|1990
|The Falling Leaves
|Timeless
| 1990
|Trio, with George Mraz (bass), Lewis Nash (drums)
|-
|1991
|Standards Request Live at the Keystone Korner Tokyo Vol.1
|Timeless
| 1998
|Trio, with Niels-Henning Ørsted Pedersen (bass), Alvin Queen (drums); in concert
|-
|1991
|Standards Request Live at the Keystone Korner Tokyo Vol.2
|Timeless
| 1998
|Trio, with Niels-Henning Ørsted Pedersen (bass), Alvin Queen (drums); in concert
|-
|1992?
|At the Brewhouse
|Storyville
| 1992
|Trio, with Niels-Henning Ørsted Pedersen (bass), Alvin Queen (drums); in concert
|-
|1992
|Plays Standards Live At The Blue Note Osaka
|Storyville
| 1992
|Trio, with Niels-Henning Ørsted Pedersen (bass), Alvin Queen (drums); in concert
|}

 As sideman With Gene Ammons Goodbye (Prestige, 1974)With Svend Asmussen Prize/Winners (Baystate, 1978)With Chet Baker (Chet Baker Sings) It Could Happen to You (Riverside, 1958)With Art Blakey Originally (Columbia, 1982) – recorded in 1956With Tina Brooks Back to the Tracks (Blue Note, 1998) – recorded in 1960
 The Waiting Game (Blue Note, 2002) – recorded in 1961With Clifford Brown Best Coast Jazz (EmArcy, 1954)
 Clifford Brown All Stars (EmArcy, 1956) – recorded in 1954With Benny Carter Summer Serenade (Storyville, 1982) – recorded in 1980With Paul Chambers Chambers' Music (Jazz:West, 1956)With John Coltrane High Step (Blue Note, 1975) – recorded in 1956
 Blue Train (Blue Note, 1958) – recorded in 1957With Ted Curson Plenty of Horn (Old Town, 1961)With Eddie "Lockjaw" Davis All of Me (SteepleChase, 1983)With Kenny Dorham Showboat (Time, 1960)
 Whistle Stop (Blue Note, 1961) – recorded in 1960With Teddy Edwards Out of This World (SteepleChase, 1980)With Art Farmer Farmer's Market (New Jazz, 1956)
 Manhattan (Soul Note, 1981)With Dizzy Gillespie The Giant (America, 1973) 
 The Source (America, 1973)With Dexter Gordon Daddy Plays the Horn (Bethlehem, 1955)
 Dexter Calling... (Blue Note, 1962) – recorded in 1961
 One Flight Up (Blue Note, 1965) – recorded in 1964
 A Day in Copenhagen (MPS, 1969) with Slide Hampton
 Some Other Spring (Sonet, 1970) with Karin Krog
 The Apartment (SteepleChase, 1975)
 Swiss Nights Vol. 1 (SteepleChase, 1976) – recorded in 1975
 Swiss Nights Vol. 2 (SteepleChase, 1978) – recorded in 1975
 Swiss Nights Vol. 3 (SteepleChase, 1979) – recorded in 1975
 Landslide (Blue Note, 1980) – recorded in 1961-62
 Both Sides of Midnight (Black Lion, 1981) – recorded in 1967
 Body and Soul (Black Lion, 1981)   – recorded in 1967
 Take the "A" Train (Black Lion, 1988) – recorded in 1967
 The Squirrel (Blue Note, 1997) – recorded in 1967
 Loose Walk (SteepleChase, 2003)  – recorded in 1965
 Misty (SteepleChase, 2004) – recorded in 1965
 Heartaches (SteepleChase, 2004) – recorded in 1965
 Ladybird (SteepleChase, 2005) – recorded in 1965
 Stella by Starlight (SteepleChase, 2005) – recorded in 1966
 Live In Tokyo 1975 (Elemental Music, 2018) – recorded in 1975With Grant Green Sunday Mornin' (Blue Note, 1962) – recorded in 1961With Johnny Griffin Blues for Harvey (SteepleChase, 1973)With Ernie Henry Presenting Ernie Henry (Riverside, 1956)With Ken McIntyre 
Hindsight (SteepleChase, 1974)
Open Horizon (SteepleChase, 1976) – recorded in 1965With Jackie McLean Jackie's Bag (Blue Note, 1960) – recorded in 1959-60
 Bluesnik (Blue Note, 1962) – recorded in 1961
 Live at Montmartre (SteepleChase, 1972)
 A Ghetto Lullaby (SteepleChase, 1974) – recorded in 1973
 The Meeting (SteepleChase, 1974) with Dexter Gordon – recorded in 1973
 The Source (SteepleChase, 1974) with Dexter Gordon – recorded in 1973With Ray Nance Huffin'n'Puffin' (MPS 1972) – recorded in 1971With Kim Parker Havin' Myself a Time (Soul Note, 1982) – recorded in 1981With Rita Reys The Cool Voice of Rita Reys (Columbia, 1956) – recorded in 1955-56With Sonny Rollins Sonny Rollins with the Modern Jazz Quartet (Prestige, 1951)
 Tour de Force (Prestige, 1956)
 Sonny Boy (Prestige, 1961)  – recorded in 1956Wíth Sahib Shihab Sentiments (Storyville, 1972) – recorded in 1971With Sonny Stitt Kaleidoscope (Prestige, 1957) – recorded in 1950
 Stitt's Bits (Prestige, 1958) – recorded in 1950With Toots Thielemans Man Bites Harmonica! (Riverside, 1957)With Ben Webster Stormy Weather (Black Lion, 1970) – recorded in 1965
 Sunday Morning At The Montmartre (Black Lion, 1977) – recorded in 1965. reissued as Gone with the Wind.With Tiziana Ghiglioni'''
 Sounds Of Love'' (Soul Note, 1983)

References

External links
 [ AllMusic]
 Discography
 

1928 births
1993 deaths
The High School of Music & Art alumni
American expatriates in Denmark
Post-bop pianists
Mainstream jazz pianists
Hard bop pianists
American jazz pianists
American male pianists
Danish jazz pianists
Musicians from New York City
SteepleChase Records artists
Xanadu Records artists
Timeless Records artists
Riverside Records artists
Blue Note Records artists
American emigrants to Denmark
20th-century American pianists
Jazz musicians from New York (state)
20th-century American male musicians
American male jazz musicians
Almost Big Band members